Paul Robert Abramson (November 28, 1937 – February 12, 2018) was an American political scientist known for his research and writing on American, European, and Israeli elections. He was a professor of political science at Michigan State University.

Born on November 28, 1937, in St. Louis, Missouri, Abramson graduated Phi Beta Kappa from Washington University in St. Louis in 1959 and attended the University of California at Berkeley as a Woodrow Wilson Fellow in 1959–1960. He served as a lieutenant in the US Army between 1960 and 1962, earning an MA from the University of California in 1961 and a PhD in 1967. He joined the Michigan State University political science department as an assistant professor in 1967, was promoted to associate professor in 1971, and to professor in 1977. In 1996 he was one of twelve political scientists inducted into "The American Political Science Review Hall of Fame" for publishing ten or more articles in the American Political Science Review between 1954 and 1994. Abramson died on February 12, 2018.

Select publications
Singly Authored Books:
 Generational Change in American Politics. 1975. Lexington Press. .
 The Political Socialization of Black Americans. 1977. The Free Press. .
 Political Attitudes in America. 1983. W.H. Freeman & Co. .
 Politics in the Bible. 2012. Transaction Publishers. .
 David's Politics. 2016. Lexington Books. .

Co-Authored Books:
 Value Change in Global Perspective. Coauthored with Ronald Inglehart. 1995. University of Michigan Press. . 
 A series of eighteen US presidential and congressional elections, the most recent of which is Change and Continuity in the 2012 and 2014 Elections. Coauthored with John H. Aldrich, Brad T. Gomez, and David Rohde. 2016. CQ Press. .

Abramson has written or co-written 13 book chapters, and 77 journal articles including 13 in the American Political Science Review.

References

External links
Profile at Michigan State University

1937 births
American political scientists
Michigan State University faculty
Washington University in St. Louis alumni
UC Berkeley College of Letters and Science alumni
2018 deaths